David Habiger (born February 19, 1969) is an American businessman and entrepreneur who is the president and CEO of J.D. Power.

Early life and education
Habiger was born in Joliet, Illinois. His father was a mechanical engineer and entrepreneur. In the late-1970s, his mother was engaged in the computer revolution and introduced Dave to technology at an early age. He received a bachelor's degree in business administration from St. Norbert College and began producing documentaries after graduation. In 1991, he founded Providence Productions, which focused on funding, producing, and distributing documentaries. In 1997, he received his MBA from the University of Chicago.

Career 
He began working with the ex-Lucasfilm team and founding members of Sonic Solutions in 1992, where he served as president and chief executive officer. Under his leadership, Sonic became one of the largest global providers of premium movies and TV shows via the internet and consumer electronic devices. He emphasizes engineering excellence and empowering the engineers in an organization. Since its IPO, the company has been named one of Forbes, Fortune, and Businessweek’s fastest growing companies on multiple occasions. Habiger opened the NASDAQ market in 2008 and 2010. In 2011, he sold Sonic to Rovi Corporation. He was appointed as NDS chief executive officer in July 2011. Shortly after filing with the SEC for its NYSE-listed IPO, Habiger announced the sale of NDS to Cisco for $5 billion; the sale was closed in the second half of 2012. Habiger is founder and partner at Silicon Media Partners. 

Habiger has been a pioneer in modern electric cars since the early 2000s when he co-founded an EV start-up focused on the conversion of ICE vehicles to fully electric. He was Chairman for the Electric Vehicle Commission and is a member of the Society of Automotive Engineers. 

He was named an Ernst & Young Entrepreneur of the Year. In 2008, he was chosen as one of Corporate Leader Magazine's 40-under-40 business leaders. The Hollywood Reporter chose him as one of 2010s Digital Power 50. Between March 2009 and March 2011 he oversaw a 2388% increase in Sonic's market capitalization as the company reinvented its core business, winning an Emmy Award for "technical contributions to the film and television industry." He sold Sonic to Rovi Corporation in early 2011 at a 66% premium – slightly under $1 billion after stock adjustments to the deal. He is a member of the National Association of Corporate Directors, as well as a member of the Silicon Valley Leadership Group and for the Center for Corporate Innovation. Beginning in 2012, he was a board member and CEO of Textura Corp. until its sale to Oracle in June 2016.

He serves as a director on the Chicago Federal Reserve Board. He serves on the SABOR (Systems Activities, Bank Operations, and Risk) Committee and is the Chairman of the Governance & HR Committee for the Federal Reserve. He also serves on the board of directors for the Automotive Hall of Fame.

He was named president and CEO of J.D. Power on March 21, 2018, succeeding Finbarr O'Neill, with the objective of continuing to aggressively build and enhance the company's data and analytics and customer insights leadership.

In 2019, he hosted a discussion with Apple co-founder Steve Wozniak at the Auto Revolution 2019 event, where Wozniak, an avid proponent for self-driving vehicles, explained that true "Level 5" autonomy, in which cars are completely self-driving, is still a long way from mainstream commercialization.

Habiger was recognized as an Automotive News All-Star in 2021 for his leadership in the automotive industry.

Habiger sits on the advisory boards for the Heroic Imagination Project, the University of Chicago, and the Network for Teaching Entrepreneurship, which provides entrepreneurial education to young people from low-income communities. He is a member of the board of trustees at Rush University Medical Center. He is a member of the National Academy of Television Arts and Sciences and Society of Motion Picture & Television Engineers.

Personal life 
He is a European Union citizen and holds dual citizenship in the United States and Ireland. He is married with two children. In 2016, Habiger delivered the commencement address at St. Norbert College.

References

External links
 SonicPress Youtube Channel. Interviews with Habiger.

Living people
1969 births
People from Joliet, Illinois
University of Chicago alumni
St. Norbert College alumni
American technology chief executives